Mason A. Thayer was a member of the Wisconsin State Assembly.

Biography
Thayer was born on November 17, 1839 in Conneaut, Ohio. He later moved to Sparta, Wisconsin.

Career
Thayer was a member of the Assembly in 1882. Additionally, he was Register of Deeds of Sparta and Chairman of the Monroe County, Wisconsin Board of Supervisors. He was a Republican.

References

People from Conneaut, Ohio
People from Sparta, Wisconsin
Republican Party members of the Wisconsin State Assembly
County supervisors in Wisconsin
1839 births
Year of death missing